Vicky Chen Wen-chi (born 10 August 2003), better known by her stage name Wen Qi, is a Taiwanese actress. The daughter of a Taiwanese businessman, Chen and her parents moved to Suzhou in 2007, where she spent most of her childhood. In 2017, she won the Golden Horse Award for Best Supporting Actress for the film The Bold, the Corrupt, and the Beautiful and became the youngest actress who was nominated Golden Horse Award for Best Leading Actress for the film Angels Wear White when she was 14 years old.

In 2019, Chen is regarded as one of the "New Four Dan actresses of the post-95s Generation" (Chinese: 95后四小花旦), along with Zhang Zifeng, Zhang Xueying and Guan Xiaotong.

Filmography

Film

Television series

Awards and nominations

References

External links 
 

2003 births
Living people
Taiwanese film actresses
21st-century Taiwanese actresses
Taiwanese television actresses
Best Actress Golden Orange Award winners